Jacksonville University (JU) is a private university in Jacksonville, Florida. Located in the city's Arlington district, the school was founded in 1934 as a two-year college and was known as Jacksonville Junior College until September 5, 1956, when it shifted focus to building four-year university degree programs and later graduated its first four-year degree candidates as Jacksonville University in June 1959. It is a member of the Independent Colleges and Universities of Florida and is accredited by the Southern Association of Colleges and Schools (SACS) and the Association to Advance Collegiate Schools of Business (AACSB). JU's student body currently represents more than 40 U.S. states and approximately 45 countries around the world. As a Division I institution, it fields 18 varsity athletics teams, known as the JU Dolphins, as well as intramural sports and clubs. Among the top majors declared by JU students are aviation management, biology, nursing, business, and marine science.

History
The school was founded in 1934 by William J. Porter. Originally known as William J. Porter University, it began as a private two-year college. Since a permanent site had not yet been acquired, classes were held on the third floor auditorium of the First Baptist Church Educational Building in downtown Jacksonville. Sixty students were enrolled in Porter University's first year of operation.

The school changed its name to Jacksonville Junior College in 1935. It relocated three times over the next fifteen years, including a period in the Florida Theatre building, but the influx of GI bill students following the end of World War II made it necessary for the school to find a permanent location. In 1947 the administration purchased land in Jacksonville's Arlington neighborhood on which to establish the current campus. The first building was completed in 1950 and classes officially began. The same year the school received full accreditation as a two-year college from the Southern Association of Colleges and Schools (SACS).

In 1958 Jacksonville Junior College merged with the Jacksonville College of Music, and the name was changed to Jacksonville University. In 1959 the first four-year class of 100 students graduated, and in 1961 JU received full accreditation as a four-year school from SACS. The 1960s saw the university grow substantially as enrollment increased, dormitories were built, two new colleges were established and the Swisher Gymnasium was constructed. The first student dormitories (Williams, McGehee, Brest, Merrill and Grether Halls) opened for the fall semester of 1965 on the south part of campus for a combined total of $2.4 million. The sixth dormitory, Botts Hall, opened in 1968. In 1970 the Jacksonville University Dolphins men's basketball team, under star center Artis Gilmore, went to the NCAA Division I Championship. However, the opening of the public University of North Florida in 1972 eroded JU's enrollment, while the removal of public funding hurt the school financially. In the 1990s Jacksonville University reconfigured itself as primarily a liberal arts college and embarked on a substantial fundraising campaign, which provided for the construction of new buildings and a revision of the campus master plan. In 1997 a new cafeteria was constructed, a Visual Arts Annex opened, and the on-campus Villages Apartments finished construction and opened for students on the north part of campus. Merrill and Grether Hall were demolished in 2007 to make way for Oak Hall, a modern 500-bed dormitory, and a new parking garage.

George Hallam, in conjunction with Jacksonville University and its library staff, published an extensive history of the university titled Our Place in the Sun, which details the development and progress of the institution between its inception in 1934 through the spring of 1988. Other university publications which have chronicled JU history throughout the decades include the JU Navigator, the Riparian, and The Wave magazine.

Academics

Jacksonville University offers more than 100 majors, minors, and programs at the undergraduate level, as well as 23 master's and doctorate degree programs, leading to the M.S., M.A., M.A.T., and Master of Business Administration, Doctor of Occupational Therapy (OTD), and Doctor of Nursing Practice (DNP).

The university is divided into five colleges: the College of Arts and Sciences , the Davis College of Business & Technology, the College of Fine Arts & Humanities, the College of Law, and the Brooks Rehabilitation College of Healthcare Sciences. Along with the five colleges, the university also consists of three institutes: the Marine Science Research Institute, the Public Policy Institute, and the STEAM Institute.

The College of Arts and Sciences offers a traditional liberal arts education and includes JU's School of Education, Wilma's Little People School, Science and Mathematics, Social Sciences, Humanities, and the Naval Reserve Officer Training Corps (NROTC). JU has the second-largest Naval Reserve Officer Training Corps program in the nation and the longest-running in Florida. Jacksonville is a military- and veteran-friendly town, and is home to three major military installations. It is also an approved Yellow Ribbon School and is home to the Jacksonville University Veterans and Military Resource Center (VMRC). University staff and administration includes many distinguished veterans from multiple branches of the U.S. military.

The College of Fine Arts & Humanities, with its integrated Alexander Brest Museum and Gallery, is one of the longest-standing colleges in JU history. Undergraduate programs include dance, theatre, music, and visual arts. Graduate programs are available in choreography and visual arts. The College of Fine Arts' annual artist series is open to the public and offers more than 20 concerts, events and exhibitions per season.

The Davis College of Business & Technology (DCOBT) received its AACSB accreditation in January 2010, and is the only private, AACSB-accredited business school in North Florida. DCOBT offers both MBA and EMBA degrees, along with undergraduate business degrees in accounting, aviation management, aviation management & flight operations, business administration, business analytics, business information systems, economics, finance, international business, management, marketing, and sport business. In both 2017 and 2018, the school's CFA Research Challenge team won the CFA Institute Research Challenge in Florida, beating out schools such as University of Miami and University of Florida, and went on to compete nationally. In 2018 they won the national competition and competed as finalists in the global CFA Institute Research Challenge in Kuala Lumpur, Malaysia. The Finance department has a trading room with a Bloomberg Terminal, and a $700,000 investment fund managed by students, allowing finance majors to gain investment experience. Jacksonville University has also teamed up with the Florida Coastal School of Law to offer a joint MBA/law degree, and joined forces with Aerosim Flight Academy to provide professional flight training to students of its ever-popular aviation major.

The JU Flight Team competes in National Intercollegiate Flying Association Regional and National Safety and Flight Evaluation Conference (SAFECON) against other universities, with its best team performance in 2007. The program is the third largest in the nation, behind Spartan School in Tulsa, Oklahoma and the Embry-Riddle Aeronautical University in Daytona Beach. The team placed 10th in the nation at the National Intercollegiate Flying Association. In 2008, the team was awarded the Loening Trophy, which is given to the best collegiate aviation program in the country each year. It is currently on display in the Smithsonian in Washington, DC.

The Brooks Rehabilitation College of Healthcare Sciences (BRCHS), includes the School of Orthodontics and one of JU's many premier learning environments, the Simulation Training and Applied Research (STAR) Center where students can participate in simulations of everything from childbirth to wound care.

The university's BRCHS program offers Bachelor of Science in Kinesiology, Bachelor of Science in Nursing, and a Master of Science in Nursing degree, among many other degree programs and certifications. In 2014, Jacksonville University partnered with Brooks Rehabilitation Hospital to create the Brooks Rehabilitation Speech-Language Pathology program. BRCHS is affiliated with hundreds of local healthcare partners, including Nemours Children's Clinic, Baptist Health Systems, Shands, St. Vincent's Healthcare, Florida Blue, Duval County Public Schools, and Wolfson Children's Hospital.

In 2012, the university established the Public Policy Institute (PPI), offering the only Master in Public Policy (MPP) degree program in the state of Florida. The institute also offers dual degree programs in conjunction with the Davis College of Business and hosts a variety of politically related events, including televised debates for local and regional elections, a radio program titled Policy Matters, and internship opportunities with local companies, local government and the Office of the Governor.

On February 28, 2022, Jacksonville University announced that with the assistance of a Jacksonville municipal grant they are starting a law school. The announcement was made by Jacksonville University President Tim Cost and Mayor Lenny Curry. The location will be in the VyStar Building downtown where Jacksonville University already has a facility for working students. The law school opened in August 2022 with an initial enrollment of 14 students, the first new law school to open in the U.S. since 2014.  Only 40% of freshmen graduate in four years and 31% leave after the first year. 

In November 2022, the university announced that it has partnered with the Lake Erie College of Osteopathic Medicine to open a branch of the medical school at the Arlington Campus by 2026. 

Jacksonville University Life Sciences Museum is a life science and natural history museum housed here. The museums exhibits include shells, fossils, bird mounts, bones, and animal skins.

Athletics

The JU athletic programs participate in NCAA Division I in the Atlantic Sun Conference, with the exception of the rowing program, which competes in the MAAC Conference (NCAA Division I).

Terry Alexander, the most successful coach in Jacksonville's baseball history with 631 wins, entered his 31st year at Jacksonville and his 20th year as the program's head coach. He has led the program to nine NCAA regional appearances, won six conference championships (1995, 1999, 2003, 2006, 2007, 2009) and has completed five 40-win seasons. He has also coached 10 All-America honorees, 50 all-conference selections and helped 44 players get drafted by Major League Baseball organizations.

The basketball program has produced professional basketball players such as Artis Gilmore, Otis Smith, Pembrook Burrows III and Rex Morgan. In 1970, Jacksonville University became the second smallest school (behind St. Bonaventure) to make it to the NCAA Final Four and the national championship game. The team was led by head coach Joe Williams. After defeating the St. Bonaventure team in the tournament semi-finals, the Dolphins lost to the UCLA Bruins in the national championship. The following season, Jacksonville became the first college basketball team to average 100+ points per game, at a time when there was no three-point shot and no shot clock in college basketball. In 2009, Jacksonville won the regular season Atlantic Sun Conference title in men's basketball, but fell to East Tennessee State in the conference tournament title game. The Dolphins were invited to the National Invitation Tournament, the school's first post-season tournament since 1986, but lost in the first round to the University of Florida Gators.

The football program began play in 1998, winning its first Pioneer League title in 2008. The Dolphins competed in the Football Championship Series (FCS), where they won two division titles and two conference championships. The university discontinued its football program at the conclusion of the 2019 season.

JU is noted for its rowing program after taking the overall FIRA Cup (Florida Intercollegiate Rowing Association) in 2007 and again in 2014. The women's rowing team won their first MAAC Championship in 2014 and won an automatic bid to the NCAA Div I National Championship (JU Website). Recently, JU has expanded its rowing program with the addition of the Negaard Rowing Center. The JU rowing program has had over 50 years of success around the world and has competed in locations such as the Nile River and England's Henley Royal Regatta.

The school added men's and women's lacrosse programs during the 2009–2010 academic year.

In 2016 Jacksonville University landed a pair of lacrosse icons to lead its men's lacrosse program as Providence College assistant coach John Galloway was named head coach. One of the young legends in the sport, he was at Providence for four years after spending one year as a volunteer assistant at Duke. He brought along one of the game's most famous players, Casey Powell, as his offensive coordinator.

Greek and student life

The school's Greek system, including, by some estimates, 15% of the school, includes Alpha Phi Alpha, Pi Kappa Alpha, Kappa Alpha Psi, Sigma Chi, and Sigma Nu fraternities; and Alpha Kappa Alpha, Delta Delta Delta, Alpha Epsilon Phi, Alpha Delta Pi, and Gamma Phi Beta sororities.

53% of all students live on campus in one of three residential halls and eight apartment-style housing facilities. Most residence halls provide academic and social events as well as host programs to acclimate incoming students to the college experience.

While Greeks do offer some social events, many residence halls also host their own events. Alcohol policies are strictly enforced.

The student center (the Davis Student Commons Building) includes a fitness center overlooking the St. Johns River, a Chick-Fil-A, and a game room for all campus community members, while serving as a focal point for campus life. The facility opened in October 2006.

Student life at Jacksonville University includes a diverse range of activities and organizations. There are multicultural, arts, political and social action, service and professional, religious, sports and recreation, academic and professional, and special interest groups.

There are a variety of campus ministries on campus. In 2011, another campus ministry, the Campus to City Wesley Foundation, started meeting at JU.

Campus media organizations include the student newspaper (The Navigator), campus radio station (JU108), literary and arts magazine (The Aquarian), student-run broadcasting station (Dolphin Channel), and yearbook (The Riparian), which stopped its publication in 2010.

Jacksonville University's Student Government Association serves the needs of the student body as a whole by electing representatives from the university's student organizations, residential communities and colleges.

The Florida Leader magazine ranked JU as having the third-best positive student life experience out of the 28 private colleges and universities in the state, citing its small campus size, peer and faculty relationships, and the close-knit campus community.

Notable alumni
This list of Jacksonville University alumni includes graduates, non-graduate former students and current students of Jacksonville University.

List of University presidents

See also

 Independent Colleges and Universities of Florida

Notes

References

External links

 

 
Private universities and colleges in Florida
Universities and colleges in Jacksonville, Florida
Educational institutions established in 1934
Universities and colleges accredited by the Southern Association of Colleges and Schools
1934 establishments in Florida
Arlington, Jacksonville
Universities and colleges in the Jacksonville metropolitan area
Jacksonville Modern architecture
Glassmaking schools